Alexey Shchebelin (born 13 July 1981) is a Russian former professional road cyclist.

Major results

2002
 2nd Ronde van Limburg
2003
 1st Poreč Trophy 3
2004
 3rd GP San Giuseppe
2006
 1st Stage 3 Giro della Valle d'Aosta
 1st Stage 1b Giro del Friuli Venezia Giulia (TTT)
 2nd Ruota d'Oro
2007
 1st Stage 3 Paths of King Nikola
 3rd Overall Vuelta a Navarra
2008
 1st  Overall Tour du Maroc
1st Stages 1, 4 & 7
 1st  Overall Circuito Montañés
1st Stage 6
2009
 1st  Overall Tour of Romania
1st Stage 7

References

1981 births
Living people
Russian male cyclists
Place of birth missing (living people)